The history of the Wests Tigers goes back to the merger of the Western Suburbs Magpies and Balmain Tigers which took place in 2000.

Previous seasons

2000 

Balmain coach Wayne Pearce was the initial coach of the Wests Tigers and new recruit Jarrod McCracken was named captain. A large crowd attended the first trial match played by the team.
Before the first round the Tigers were controversially denied a place in the double header at Stadium Australia. It was rumoured that the NRL did not believe the side would be competitive against their opening round opponents and competition heavyweights Brisbane. The debut match for the side was therefore held at Campelltown where after leading 18-6 the side snatched a 24-all draw after falling behind late. 
The Tigers surprised many by maintaining a high place on the ladder for most of the year (often in second place). Heartbreaking losses to Penrith (after leading 31-8) and in the snow against Canberra combined with injuries to key players saw the Tigers slide out of the 8. The loss of inspirational captain Jarrod McCracken from a spear tackle against Melbourne was a crucial blow.

2001 

2002 was a bitter year for the joint venture club, including off-field incidents. After Wayne Pearce announced he would no longer coach the team, Terry Lamb was appointed to the position. This was a controversial selection because of animosity from Balmain supporters due to an incident involving Ellery Hanley in the 1988 Grand Final (see Terry Lamb entry for more information). 
Early in the season key players Craig Field and Kevin McGuinness tested positive to cocaine and received long suspensions. Field was the team's halfback and playmaker whilst McGuinness was a leading try scorer for the club.
Later in the season another big name player was suspended: John Hopoate earned worldwide notoriety when he was charged with inserting his finger into the anus (pushing the players' shorts) of opposition players. Hopoate quit the club and received a long suspension. Lamb was criticised for seeming to condone the activity.

2002 

During the season the club announced Terry Lamb would not have his contract renewed. The side struggled near the foot of the ladder and only a large victory over Souths moved them clear of the wooden spoon position.

The coaching job for 2003 was offered to (and rejected by) both Craig Bellamy and Ian Millward before Tim Sheens was selected. The selection was by no means seen as a positive move by the media as Sheens most recent coaching stint had seen him sacked by the North Queensland Cowboys.

2003 

The 2003 season was notable for the emergence of new young players through the team as the club moved away from the era of big names and big money signings and focused on developing junior talent. Most notably Benji Marshall, then a schoolboy prodigy with no senior league experience, made his debut against the Newcastle Knights.

2004 

The Tigers improved greatly in 2004 aided by astute signings of players such as Brett Hodgson and Pat Richards who began to blend well with the younger players emerging as talents. 
The Tigers narrowly missed the playoffs after losing their final three games when a single victory would have guaranteed finals football for the first time. Key injuries to play makers played a large part as did a long list of errors and tough calls by officials during the year.

2005 

2005 was the Wests Tigers best season yet, as they not only made it to the finals for the first time, but also reached the top four in the round robin part of the competition, setting crowd attendance records at three different grounds: Campbelltown Stadium (20,527), Telstra Stadium (29,542) and Leichhardt Oval (22,877).

After a slow start, bookmakers rated the Tigers a 150-1 chance to win the premiership. However the club emerged from the bottom half of the table to win a club record 8 in a row before finishing 4th. The team developed a reputation as a flamboyant attacking side who played at a rapid pace to compensate a lack of forward size. 

The Tigers played their first ever final as a joint venture club at Telstra Stadium against North Queensland. Backed by a passionate crowd the team won 50–6. They then beat the Brisbane Broncos 34-6 and premiership favourites St George Illawarra Dragons 20–12 to book a spot against the North Queensland Cowboys.

2005 Grand Final

Based on their winning form (they had won 11 of their last 13) and their big win over the Cowboys in the opening finals game, the Wests Tigers were rated favourites to win the 2005 grand final. After a slow start, Bryce Gibbs and Pat Richards scored tries to give the Tigers a 12–6 lead. The Richards try has been called one of the all-time great Grand Final tries. The try was started by five-eighth Benji Marshall, who received the ball from Brett Hodgson 98 metres from the opposition tryline. He beat Cowboys five-eighth Johnathan Thurston and Matt Sing. He then ran 60 metres, only to be caught by Cowboys fullback Matt Bowen. He made a flick pass to Pat Richards, who then fended off Rod Jensen to score.

In the 2nd half the Tigers gained control with tries to Anthony Laffranchi and Daniel Fitzhenry. After withstanding a Cowboys fightback, a Todd Payten try on full-time sealed a 30–16 win.
Captain Scott Prince was then awarded the Clive Churchill medal for 2005. Prince joins football great Peter Sterling who was the original recipient of the medal. Ben Galea, John Skandalis, Benji Marshall among others starred for the Tigers.

The premiership victory meant that the club joined an exclusive group that won premierships in their first finals appearance, which had not been achieved in almost 100 years. The group also includes Souths in 1908 and Newtown in 1910.

2006 

Following the premiership win several key players left the club. From the grand final team, Mark O'Neill, and Pat Richards signed with English clubs. New signings included Jamaal Lolesi (Bulldogs), Keith Galloway (Cronulla Sharks) and Ryan O'Hara (Canberra Raiders).

As defending premiers, the Tigers began the season by travelling to England to play ESL champions the Bradford Bulls. Missing many of their star players the Tigers tried hard but were eventually beaten 10–30. After a come from behind win over competition heavyweights St George-Illawarra, the team struggled with injuries to key players. Most notably Benji Marshall and Brett Hodgson missed large portions of the season. The team suffered a number of narrow losses late in games and also two golden point (extra time) matches in controversial circumstances.

The Tigers narrowly missed the finals and the chance to defend their title. One highlight of the season was the debut of several players including Chris Lawrence and the emergence of up and coming players such as Dean Collis. Brett Hodgson played for the NSW State of Origin team in all three games.

2013 - The Worst Year for the Tigers 

In 2013, the Wests Tigers had a horror season and finished on the ladder in 15th and did not qualify for the finals.

See also
Western Suburbs Magpies
Balmain Tigers

Wests Tigers